Bhubneshwar Prasad Mehta (born 2 August 1940) is an Indian politician, affiliated to the Communist Party of India. He represented the Hazaribagh constituency of Jharkhand in the 14th Lok Sabha.

Biography
Mehta was born in August 2, 1940 in a poor farmer family belonging to Sokiyaar koorm kshatriya community. He worked as a coal union leader in his early days. He is known as Stalin of Jharkhand. He won the 2004 Lok Sabha elections on a CPI ticket, defeating BJP's Yashwant Sinha, who served as the finance minister in the Vajpayee government. However, Mehta lost the next election to Yashwant Sinha.

References

External links
Home Page on the Parliament of India's Website

1940 births
Communist Party of India politicians from Jharkhand
Living people
People from Hazaribagh district
India MPs 2004–2009
India MPs 1991–1996
Lok Sabha members from Jharkhand